James E. Malone Jr. (born July 8, 1957) is an American politician from Maryland and a member of the Democratic Party. He served in the Maryland House of Delegates, representing Maryland's District 12A in Baltimore and Howard Counties from 1995 to 2014. Malone went on to serve as Director, Harford County Department of Parks and Recreation from 2014 to 2016.

Personal life
Malone was born in Baltimore on July 8, 1957. He graduated with an A.A. degree from Catonsville Community College in 1986 and spent 28 years working as a firefighter for the Baltimore County Fire Department, retiring in 2007. In the House of Delegates, Malone has worked extensively on issues related to transportation.

He has 2 kids, a daughter named Danica, and a son, James III.

Legislative notes
 voted for the Maryland Gang Prosecution Act of 2007 (HB713), subjecting gang members to up to 20 years in prison and/or a fine of up to $100,000 
 voted for Jessica's Law (HB 930), eliminating parole for the most violent child sexual predators and creating a mandatory minimum sentence of 25 years in state prison, 2007 
 voted for Public Safety – Statewide DNA Database System – Crimes of Violence and Burglary – Post conviction (HB 370), helping to give police officers and prosecutors greater resources to solve crimes and eliminating a backlog of 24,000 unanalyzed DNA samples, leading to 192 arrests, 2008 
 voted for Vehicle Laws – Repeated Drunk and Drugged Driving Offenses – Suspension of License (HB 293), strengthening Maryland's drunk driving laws by imposing a mandatory one year license suspension for a person convicted of drunk driving more than once in five years, 2009 
 voted for HB 102, creating the House Emergency Medical Services System Workgroup, leading to Maryland's budgeting of $52 million to fund three new Medevac helicopters to replace the State's aging fleet, 2009

Election results
2010 Race for Maryland House of Delegates – District 12A
Voters to choose two:
{| class="wikitable"
!Name
!Votes
!Percent
!Outcome
|-
|-
|-
|James E. Malone Jr., Dem.
|14,109
|  28%
|   Won
|-
|-
|Steven J. DeBoy Sr., Dem.
|10,626
|  26%
|   Won
|-
|-
|Joseph D. Hooe, Rep.
|12,327
|  23%
|   Lost
|-
|-
|Albert L. Nalley, Rep.
|10,453
|  20%
|   Lost
|}

2006 Race for Maryland House of Delegates – District 12A
Voters to choose two:
{| class="wikitable"
!Name
!Votes
!Percent
!Outcome
|-
|-
|-
|James E. Malone Jr., Dem.
|15,130
|  31%
|   Won
|-
|-
|Steven J. DeBoy Sr., Dem.
|13,929
|  28%
|   Won
|-
|-
|Joseph D. Hooe, Rep.
|11,141
|  23%
|   Lost
|-
|-
|Albert L. Nalley, Rep.
|9,286
|  20%
|   Lost
|}

2002 Race for Maryland House of Delegates – District 12A
Voters to choose two:
{| class="wikitable"
!Name
!Votes
!Percent
!Outcome
|-
|-
|-
|James E. Malone Jr., Dem.
|15,615
|  32%
|   Won
|-
|-
|Steven J. DeBoy Sr., Dem.
|10,669
|  25%
|   Won
|-
|-
|Joseph D. Hooe, Rep.
|11,193
|  23%
|   Lost
|-
|-
|Harry Korrell, Rep.
|9,875
|  20%
|   Lost
|}

1998 Race for Maryland House of Delegates – District 12A
Voters to choose two:
{| class="wikitable"
!Name
!Votes
!Percent
!Outcome
|-
|-
|-
|James E. Malone Jr., Dem.
|13,222
|  31%
|   Won
|-
|-
|Donald E. Murphy, Rep.
|10,920
|  26%
|   Won
|-
|-
|Steven J. DeBoy Sr., Dem.
|10,669
|  25%
|   Lost
|-
|-
|Loyd V. Smith, Rep.
|7,245
|  17%
|   Lost
|}

1994 Race for Maryland House of Delegates – District 12A
Voters to choose two:
{| class="wikitable"
!Name
!Votes
!Percent
!Outcome
|-
|-
|-
|Donald E. Murphy, Rep.
|10,340
|  27%
|   Won
|-
|-
|James E. Malone Jr., Dem.
|9,712
|  25%
|   Won
|-
|-
|Donald Drehoff, Rep.
|9,596
|  22%
|   Lost
|-
|-
|Kenneth H. Masters, Dem.
|8,527
|  22%
|   Lost
|}

References

Democratic Party members of the Maryland House of Delegates
Living people
1957 births
People from Arbutus, Maryland
21st-century American politicians